Passo Tanarello (in Italian) or Pas du Tanarel (in French) at 2,042 m is a mountain pass in the Ligurian Alps. It connects the valleys of Roya in France and Tanaro in Italy.

Etymology 
Tanarello is the diminutive form of Tanaro, the main right-bank tributary of the River Po.

Geography 

Passo Tanarello is located on the main chain of the Alps between Monte Tanarello and Cima Ventosa. It connects the basins of the Ligurian Sea (south of the pass) and the River Po. Administratively the Italian side belongs to the municipality of Briga Alta and the French side to La Brigue.

Located near the pass are the remains of an old barracks and a small building still used by local farmers.

History 
Up to World War II, the pass was totally in Italian territory, but due to the Paris Peace Treaties signed in February 1947, it is now on the border between Italy and France.

Hiking 
The pass is easily accessible by walking and mountain bike by following the old military road. Monte Tanarello can be climbed using unmarked footpaths accessed from the path to the south and Cima Ventosa can be climbed to the north. It can also be accessed in winter with snowshoes.

See also

 List of mountain passes
 France–Italy border

References

Mountain passes of Piedmont
Mountain passes of Provence-Alpes-Côte d'Azur
Mountain passes of the Ligurian Alps
France–Italy border crossings